Pępice  is a village in the administrative district of Gmina Skarbimierz, within Brzeg County, Opole Voivodeship, in south-western Poland.

The village has a population of 360.

The village dates back to the medieval Kingdom of Poland and was first mentioned in the Liber fundationis episcopatus Vratislaviensis chronicle from the late 13th-early 14th century. Between 1871 and 1945 it was part of Germany. During World War II, the Germans established a subcamp of the Gross-Rosen concentration camp, whose prisoners were mainly Poles from Warsaw and Kraków.

There is a historic church of Our Lady of the Rosary in Pępice.

References

External links 
 Jewish Community in Pępice on Virtual Shtetl

Villages in Brzeg County